The Canadian Champion Two-Year-Old Filly is a  Canadian Thoroughbred horse racing honor. Created in 1975 by the Jockey Club of Canada, it is part of the Sovereign Awards program and is awarded annually to the top 2-Year-Old Filly Thoroughbred horse competing in Canada.

Past winners

2020: Lady Speightspeare
2019: Curlin's Voyage
2018: Bold Script
2017: Wonder Gadot
2016: Victory to Victory
2015: Catch a Glimpse
2014: Conquest Harlanate
2013: Ria Antonia
2012: Spring in the Air
2011: Tu Endie Wei
2010: Delightful Mary
2009: Biofuel and Negligee (tie)
2008: Van Lear Rose
2007: Dancing Allstar
2006: Catch the Thrill
2005: Knights Templar 
2004: Simply Lovely
2003: My Vintage Port
2002: Brusque
2001: Ginger Gold
2000: Poetically
1999: Hello Seattle
1998: Fantasy Lake
1997: Primaly
1996: Larkwhistle
1995: Silken Cat
1994: Honky Tonk Tune
1993: Term Limits
1992: Deputy Jane West
1991: Bucky's Solution
1990: Dance Smartly
1989: Wavering Girl
1988: Legarto
1987: Phoenix Factor
1986: Ruling Angel
1985: Stage Flite
1984: Deceit Dancer
1983: Ada Prospect
1982: Candle Bright
1981: Choral Group
1980: Rainbow Connection
1979: Par Excellance
1978: Liz's Pride
1977: L'Alezane
1976: Northernette
1975: Seraphic

References
The Sovereign Awards at the Jockey Club of Canada website

Horse racing awards
Horse racing in Canada
Sovereign Award winners